The Holland Steamship Company (Dutch: Hollandsche Stoomboot Maatschappij, HSM) was formed in Amsterdam in 1885 to run a steamship service from Amsterdam to London.

History
 1827 – 70 ft. paddle steamer "Beurs van Amsterdam" of the Amsterdamsche Stoomboot Maatschappij served on an Amsterdam - London line for 1 year.
 1849 - Amsterdam Screw Schooner Company sets up a service to London.
 1885 - Hollandsche Stoomboot Maats. [ HSM ] or Holland Steamship Co. commenced operating with a one ship service which was doubled later that year when "Amstelstroom" was delivered.
 1974 - Having discontinued passenger services after World War II, the company's many cargo vessels continued to trade until  1974  when finally operations ceased.

Routes
 Passenger / Cargo : Amsterdam to London. Initially to Brewer's Quay but later transferring to Hay's Wharf also within the Pool of London. After World War I the service moved again within the Pool to Enderby's Wharf ;  and Amsterdam to Hull.
 Cargo : Amsterdam to Belfast / Bristol / Cardiff / Cork / Dublin / Fowey / Grangemouth / Shoreham / Swansea / Teignmouth / Waterford ;   and Flushing to Shoreham.

Livery
Funnel: Yellow with black top.

Passenger / Cargo Vessels employed

Cargo only services
Outside of its passenger / cargo services, HSM operated cargo services to many ports around the coasts of the U.K. and Ireland - see 'Routes' above.

Passengers would occasionally be carried on these vessels but it was on an ad hoc basis.

A feature of the ships deployed on the London service was the mounting of deck cranes to facilitate speedy cargo handling.

External links
Archief van de Hollandsche Stoomboot Maatschappij te Amsterdam N.V. (Archive of the Dutch Steamboat Company of Amsterdam) from the Amsterdam City Archives

References

Defunct shipping companies of the Netherlands
Companies based in Amsterdam
19th century in Amsterdam
Defunct transport companies of the Netherlands